M Network was a video game division of Mattel that, in the 1980s, produced games in cartridge format for the Atari 2600 video game system.

History 

In the early 1980s, Mattel's Intellivision video game console was a direct competitor to Atari's Video Computer System (VCS), better known as the Atari 2600. Although Mattel designed and produced video game cartridges for their own system, the company surprised the industry by also releasing simplified versions of its games for the 2600 under the M Network label.

M Network produced home ports of popular arcade games, including BurgerTime, Bump 'n' Jump and Lock 'n' Chase (all 1982) as well as original titles such as Tron: Deadly Discs (1982 – based on the Disney movie) and Kool-Aid Man (1983), one of the earliest "promogames", originally available only via mail order by sending in UPC symbols from Kool-Aid containers.

Mattel programmers (named by TV Guide as the "Blue Sky Rangers") were also encouraged to develop video game tie-ins with other Mattel properties; games such as Masters of the Universe: The Power of He-Man (1983), leveraging Mattel's Masters of the Universe media franchise, were released.

M Network cartridges made for the 2600 were physically similar to Intellivision cartridges, but with a base designed to fit the 2600's larger cartridge slot. Most of the names were changed for the 2600 version; Astrosmash was, for example, renamed Astroblast.

Although Mattel, through M Network, released cartridges for Atari consoles, they balked at allowing Atari to release cartridges for the Intellivision: in the early 1980s the company filed a lawsuit against Atari alleging that Atari had stolen Mattel's trade secrets when it hired former Mattel employees to develop a line of Intellivision-compatible cartridges.

References 

Mattel
Atari 2600
Defunct video game companies of the United States